Senator Neal may refer to:

Gerald Neal (born 1945), Kentucky State Senate
Henry S. Neal (1828–1906), Ohio State Senate
Joe Neal (politician) (born 1935), Nevada State Senate
John R. Neal (1836–1889), Tennessee State Senate
John Randolph Neal Jr. (1876–1959), Tennessee State Senate
Margie Neal (1875–1971), Texas State Senate
Pat Neal (born 1949), Florida State Senate
Peter M. Neal (1811–1906), Massachusetts State Senate

See also
Oscar W. Neale (1873–1957), Wisconsin State Senate
Robert R. Neall (born 1948), Maryland State Senate
Marshall Allen Neill (1914–1979), Washington State Senate